Brown Chapel United Methodist Church is a historic African American Church located at 13893 Dayton Meadows Ct in Dayton, Maryland.

The building was constructed in 1875.

See also
Asbury Methodist Episcopal Church (Annapolis Junction, Maryland)
Locust United Methodist Church
Mt. Moriah Lodge No. 7

References

African-American history of Howard County, Maryland
Howard County, Maryland landmarks
Churches completed in 1875
Churches in Howard County, Maryland
Methodist churches in Maryland